Pierre is a French given name.

Pierre may also refer to:

Places
 Pierre, South Dakota, USA; the capital of South Dakota
 Rivière à Pierre (Batiscan River tributary), in Portneuf Regional County Municipality, Quebec, Canada
 Pierre River (Mitchinamecus River tributary), in Baie-Obaoca, Quebec, Canada

Facilities and structures
 Pierre University, a former university in Pierre, SD, that moved to Huron, SD, and was renamed
 Pierre (restaurant), a restaurant in the Mandarin Oriental Hotel in Hong Kong
 The Pierre, a luxury hotel in New York City

Literature
 Pierre: or, The Ambiguities, a novel by Herman Melville
 Pierre (A Cautionary Tale), a children's story by Maurice Sendak

Other uses
 Pierre (penguin) (1983–2016), an African penguin at the California Academy of Sciences in San Francisco
 "Pierre" (song), a 2015 song by Ryn Weaver
 Pierre, a 1985 animated film by John R. Dilworth

See also

 
 
 Pier (disambiguation)
 Saint-Pierre (disambiguation)